Dick de Boer (born 28 December 1948) is a Dutch football manager.

References

Dutch football managers
1948 births
Living people
FC Volendam non-playing staff
FC Volendam managers
FC Utrecht non-playing staff
SC Cambuur managers
Expatriate football managers in Zimbabwe
SBV Vitesse non-playing staff
SV Spakenburg managers
Expatriate football managers in the Democratic Republic of the Congo
Almere City FC managers
Dutch expatriate football managers
People from Volendam
AFC '34 managers
Sportspeople from North Holland